Gold is a novel by British author Dan Rhodes published in March 2007 by Canongate. It won the inaugural Clare Maclean Prize for Scottish Fiction and has since been published in five other languages: Spanish, Danish, Finnish, Dutch, Norwegian. It was also one of the 'best books of 2007' according to critics at The Independent.

Plot introduction

Set in a coastal village in Pembrokeshire, the novel concerns Miyuki Woodward, a young Welsh-Japanese woman who spends a month every winter staying in a nearby cottage, away from her female partner Grindl (with whom she runs a decorating business), as a lesson in not taking each other for granted. Her appearance in the local pub is welcomed by all, but this year she becomes more involved in the local community than usual; the gold in the title referring to her impulsive gold spray-painting of a prominent boulder on a nearby beach, which soon attracts the attention of the local police.

References

External links
webpage
Independent review
Starting a gold rush in darkest Wales Sunday Herald review
There's gold in them there nostrils Guardian review

2007 British novels
Novels with lesbian themes
Works by Dan Rhodes
Novels set in Wales
Pembrokeshire
Canongate Books books